The Corday–Morgan Medal and Prize is awarded by the Royal Society of Chemistry for the most meritorious contributions to experimental chemistry, including computer simulation. The prize was established by chemist Gilbert Morgan, who named it after his father Thomas Morgan and his mother Mary-Louise Corday. From the award's inception in 1949 until 1980 it was awarded by the Chemical Society.  Up to three prizes are awarded annually.

Recipients 

The Corday–Morgan medallists have included many of the UK's most successful chemists. Since 1949 they have been:

  Junwang Tang Jan Verlet
  Rachel O'Reilly Edward W. Tate

See also

 List of chemistry awards

References

Awards established in 1949
Awards of the Royal Society of Chemistry
1949 establishments in England